Sigfredo "Tito" Casero-Ortiz (born 21 March 1997) is a Cuban-born naturalized Belgian professional basketball player for Yoast United. Standing at 1.84 m (6 ft 0 in), he usually plays as point guard.

Career
A native of Havana, Cuba, Casero-Ortiz moved to Belgium in 2010. Casero-Ortiz played for the under-21 team of Belgian club Spirou Charleroi, where he was considered one of its top players. During the end of the 2017–18 season, he signed with GET Vosges of the Nationale Masculine 1. In April 2018, he declared for the 2018 NBA draft.

On 6 June 2018, Casero-Ortiz signed for Okapi Aalstar of the Belgian Pro Basketball League. In the 2018–19 season, he won the PBL Rising Star Award.

In 2020, he played for Spanish side CB Morón in the LEB Silver.

In the 2022–23 season, Casero-Ortiz played for Dutch club Yoast United.

International career
Casero-Ortiz played for the U-16 and U-20 Belgian national basketball team. He participated at the 2017 FIBA Europe Under-20 Championship Division. He also has experience at the FIBA Europe Under-18 3x3 Championships.

References

1997 births
Living people
Belgian men's basketball players
Belgian people of Cuban descent
Cuban men's basketball players
Okapi Aalstar players
People from Havana
Point guards
Yoast United players